The 2017 NBA draft was held on June 22, 2017, at Barclays Center in Brooklyn, New York. National Basketball Association (NBA) teams took turns selecting U.S. college basketball players and other eligible players, including international players.

The draft lottery took place during the playoffs on May 16, 2017. The 53–29 Boston Celtics, who were also the #1 seed in the Eastern Conference and reached the Eastern Conference Finals at the time of the NBA draft lottery, won the #1 pick with pick swapping rights thanks to a previous trade with the Brooklyn Nets, who had the worst record the previous season. The Los Angeles Lakers, who had risked losing their 2017 first round pick to the Philadelphia 76ers, moved up two spots to get the Second overall pick, while Philadelphia moved up to receive the No. 3 pick due to the Sacramento Kings moving up in the draft, which activated pick swapping rights the 76ers had from an earlier trade. On June 19, four days before the NBA draft began, the Celtics and 76ers traded their top first round picks to each other, meaning the holders of the top four picks of this year's draft would be exactly the same as the previous year's draft.

The draft class was the youngest draft class to date, with the most freshmen and fewest seniors selected in the first round; the top seven picks in the draft were college freshmen. It was the third time, and the second in a row, that three players were selected from Serbian team KK Mega Basket in the same draft (Vlatko Čančar, Ognjen Jaramaz, Alpha Kaba), with it previously occurring during the 2014 and 2016 NBA draft. The draft also received much media coverage from ESPN pertaining to eventual second overall pick Lonzo Ball and his outspoken father, LaVar Ball, much to the chagrin of many sports fans and even some ESPN employees. This was one of the rare occasions where a player drafted from their year did not win Rookie of the Year; the award went to 2016 first overall pick Ben Simmons, the first player since Blake Griffin in 2011 to win the award in a year he was not drafted.

Draft selections

Notable undrafted players

These players were not selected in the 2017 NBA Draft, but have played at least one game in the NBA.

Eligibility and entrants

The draft was conducted under the eligibility rules established in the league's 2017 collective bargaining agreement (CBA) with its player's union. The CBA that ended the 2011 lockout instituted no immediate changes to the draft, but called for a committee of owners and players to discuss future changes.

 All drafted players must have been at least 19 years old during the calendar year of the draft. In terms of dates, players who are eligible for the 2017 draft, must have been born on or before December 31, 1998.
 Since the 2016 draft, the NCAA Division I council implemented the following rules for that division that significantly changed the draft landscape for college players:
 Declaration for the draft no longer resulted in automatic loss of college eligibility. As long as a player did not sign a contract with a professional team outside the NBA, or sign with an agent, he retained college eligibility as long as he made a timely withdrawal from the draft.
 NCAA players had until 10 days after the end of the NBA Draft Combine to withdraw from the draft. Since the combine was held in mid-May, the deadline was about five weeks after the previous mid-April deadline.
 NCAA players were permitted to participate in the draft combine, and were also allowed to attend one tryout per year with each NBA team without losing college eligibility.
 NCAA players were permitted to enter and withdraw from the draft up to two times without loss of eligibility. Previously, the NCAA treated a second declaration of draft eligibility as a permanent loss of college eligibility.

The NBA has since expanded the draft combine to include players with remaining college eligibility (who, like players without college eligibility, can only attend by invitation).

Early entrants
Players who were not automatically eligible for the draft had to declare their eligibility by notifying the NBA offices in writing no later than 60 days before the draft. For the 2017 draft, this date fell on April 23. After that date "early entry" players were able to attend NBA pre-draft camps and individual team workouts to show off their skills and obtain feedback regarding their draft positions. Under the CBA, a player could withdraw from consideration from the draft at any time before the final declaration date, which was 10 days before the draft. Under NCAA rules, players had until May 24 (10 days after the draft combine) to withdraw from the draft and retain college eligibility.

A player who hired an agent forfeited his remaining college eligibility regardless of whether he was drafted.

College underclassmen
At the time, a record-high 185 underclassed draft prospects (i.e., players with remaining college eligibility) had declared themselves for eligibility at the April 24 deadline (138 of them being from college), although college players who had not hired agents or signed professional contracts outside the NBA were able to decide to return to college by May 24, 10 days after the end of the NBA Draft Combine. These players have publicly indicated that they have hired agents, or had planned to do so around the start of the draft; those who hired agents immediately lost their eligibility to return to NCAA basketball in 2017–18. By the end of the May 24 deadline, 73 draft candidates from college decided to return to their respective colleges for at least another year, leaving 64 underclassmen to officially enter the draft this year. Additionally, two more players left entry at the end of the international player deadline, meaning both Maverick Rowan from North Carolina State and Darin Johnson from Cal State Northridge would not return for college, but one player managed to enter the college underclassman deadline, thus leaving 63 entries at hand for the NBA Draft.

 Bam Adebayo – F, Kentucky (freshman)
 Jarrett Allen – F, Texas (freshman)
 Ike Anigbogu – F, UCLA (freshman)
/ OG Anunoby – F, Indiana (sophomore)
 Dwayne Bacon – G, Florida State (sophomore)
 Lonzo Ball – G, UCLA (freshman)
 Jordan Bell – F, Oregon (junior)
 James Blackmon Jr. – G, Indiana (junior)
 Antonio Blakeney – G, LSU (sophomore)
 Tony Bradley – F, North Carolina (freshman)
 Isaiah Briscoe – G, Kentucky (sophomore)
 Dillon Brooks – F, Oregon (junior)
 Thomas Bryant – C, Indiana (sophomore)
 Clandell Cetoute – F, Thiel College (junior)
 John Collins – F, Wake Forest (sophomore)
 Zach Collins – F/C, Gonzaga (freshman)
 Chance Comanche – C, Arizona (sophomore)
/ Tyler Dorsey – G, Oregon (sophomore)
 PJ Dozier – G, South Carolina (sophomore)
 Jawun Evans – G, Oklahoma State (sophomore)
 Tony Farmer – F, Lee College (sophomore)
 De'Aaron Fox – G, Kentucky (freshman)
 Markelle Fultz – G, Washington (freshman)
 Harry Giles – F, Duke (freshman)
 Isaac Humphries – C, Kentucky (sophomore)
 Tre Hunter – G, Mount San Jacinto College (junior)
 Jonathan Isaac – F, Florida State (freshman)
 Frank Jackson – G, Duke (freshman)
 Josh Jackson – F, Kansas (freshman)
 Justin Jackson – F, North Carolina (junior)
 Jaylen Johnson – F, Louisville (junior)
 Ted Kapita – F, NC State (freshman)
 Marcus Keene – G, Central Michigan (junior)
 Luke Kennard – G, Duke (sophomore)
 Kyle Kuzma – F, Utah (junior)
/ T. J. Leaf – F, UCLA (freshman)
 Tyler Lydon – F, Syracuse (sophomore)
 Elijah Macon – F, West Virginia (junior)
 Lauri Markkanen – F, Arizona (freshman)
 Eric Mika – F, BYU (sophomore)
 Donovan Mitchell – G, Louisville (sophomore)
 Malik Monk – G, Kentucky (freshman)
 Johnathan Motley – F, Baylor (junior)
 Austin Nichols – F, Virginia (junior)
/ Semi Ojeleye – F, SMU (junior)
 Cameron Oliver – F, Nevada (sophomore)
 Justin Patton – C, Creighton (freshman)
 L. J. Peak – G, Georgetown (junior)
 Ivan Rabb – F, California (sophomore)
 Xavier Rathan-Mayes – G, Florida State (junior)
 Devin Robinson – F, Florida (junior)
 Josh Robinson – G, Austin Peay (junior)
 Kobi Simmons – G, Arizona (freshman)
/ Jaren Sina – G, George Washington (junior)
 Dennis Smith Jr. – G, NC State (freshman)
 Edmond Sumner – G, Xavier (junior)
 Caleb Swanigan – F, Purdue (sophomore)
 Jayson Tatum – F, Duke (freshman)
 Matt Taylor – G, New Mexico State (junior)
 Trevor Thompson – C, Ohio State (junior)
 Melo Trimble – G, Maryland (junior)
 Craig Victor II – F, LSU (junior)
 Antone Warren – C, Antelope Valley (sophomore)
 Nigel Williams-Goss – G, Gonzaga (junior)
 D. J. Wilson – F, Michigan (junior)

International players
International players that had declared this year and did not previously declare in another prior year can also drop out of the draft about 10 days before the draft begins on June 12. Initially, there were 46 players who originally expressed interest entering the 2017 draft. At the end of the international deadline, 36 players wound up declining entry for the draft, leaving only 10 international players staying in the NBA Draft. As a result, 73 total underclassmen entered the 2017 NBA Draft.

  Simon Birgander – F/C, Calzados Robusta Clavijo (Spain)
  Luka Božić – G/F, KK Zagreb (Croatia)
  Vlatko Čančar – F, Mega Leks (Serbia)
  Wesley Alves da Silva – F, Paulistano Corpore (Brazil)
  Georginho de Paula – G, Paulistano Corpore (Brazil)
  Isaiah Hartenstein – C, Žalgiris Kaunas (Lithuania)
  Jonathan Jeanne – C, SLUC Nancy (France)
  Alpha Kaba – F/C, Mega Leks (Serbia)
  Tidjan Keita – F, Cégep de Thetford (Canada)
  Frank Ntilikina – G, SIG Strasbourg (France)

Automatically eligible entrants
Players who do not meet the criteria for "international" players are automatically eligible if they meet any of the following criteria:
 They have completed four years of their college eligibility.
 If they graduated from high school in the U.S., but did not enroll in a U.S. college or university, four years have passed since their high school class graduated.
 They have signed a contract with a professional basketball team outside of the NBA, anywhere in the world, and have played under that contract.

Players who meet the criteria for "international" players are automatically eligible if they meet any of the following criteria:
 They are least 22 years old during the calendar year of the draft. In terms of dates, players born on or before December 31, 1995 are automatically eligible for the 2017 draft.
 They have signed a contract with a professional basketball team outside of the NBA within the United States, and have played under that contract.

Combine

The invitation-only NBA Draft Combine was held in Chicago from May 9 to 14. The on-court element of the combine took place on May 11 and 12. This year's event had Under Armour as its primary sponsor. A total of 67 players were invited for this year's NBA Draft Combine, with 5 more named as alternates in the event some players could not come for whatever reason. Ten invited players declined to attend for various reasons, including three players completely on the international scale. Eighteen more players that were guaranteed invitations were also players testing out their draft stocks during the event. Eleven players participating in the event were seniors, the lowest number ever of combine participants who had exhausted their college eligibility. During the event, six different players were deemed injured either before or during this year's Draft Combine. At the end of the May 24 college deadline, eight players who originally declared for the NBA Draft and were invited to the Draft Combine this year, including potential "none-and-done" Kentucky freshman redshirt Hamidou Diallo, ultimately returned to college for at least one more season.

Draft lottery

The 2017 NBA draft lottery was held on May 16.

Invited attendees
The NBA annually invites around 15–20 players to sit in the so-called "green room", a special room set aside at the draft site for the invited players plus their families and agents. When their names are called, the player leaves the room and goes up on stage. Other players who are not invited are allowed to attend the ceremony. They sit in the stands with the fans and walk up on stage when (or if) they are drafted. 10 players were invited to the 2017 NBA draft on June 8, with three more of them being invited two days later. Seven more players would be invited to complete the green room listing on June 14, bringing the total invite list to 20. The following players (listed alphabetically) were confirmed as invites for the event this year.

 Bam Adebayo, Kentucky (not on the original list, later invited)
 Jarrett Allen, Texas (not on the original list, later invited)
 Lonzo Ball, UCLA
 John Collins, Wake Forest (not on the original list, later invited)
 Zach Collins, Gonzaga
 De'Aaron Fox, Kentucky
 Markelle Fultz, Washington
 Harry Giles, Duke (not on the original list, later invited)
 Jonathan Isaac, Florida State
 Josh Jackson, Kansas
 Justin Jackson, North Carolina (not on the original list, later invited)
 Luke Kennard, Duke (not on the original list, later invited)
/ T. J. Leaf, UCLA (not on the original list, later invited)
 Lauri Markkanen, Arizona
 Donovan Mitchell, Louisville (not on the original list, later invited)
 Malik Monk, Kentucky
 Frank Ntilikina, SIG Strasbourg (not on the original list, later invited)
 Justin Patton, Creighton (not on the original list, later invited)
 Dennis Smith Jr., North Carolina State
 Jayson Tatum, Duke

Trades involving draft picks

Pre-draft trades
Prior to the day of the draft, the following trades were made and resulted in exchanges of draft picks between the teams.

Draft-day trades
Draft-day trades occurred on June 22, 2017, the day of the draft.

Notes

See also
 List of first overall NBA draft picks

References

External links

Official site

Draft
National Basketball Association draft
NBA draft
NBA draft
2010s in Brooklyn
Basketball in New York City
Sporting events in New York City
Sports in Brooklyn
Events in Brooklyn, New York